The Rusk County Expo Center is a 4,700-seat multi-purpose arena in Henderson, Texas. Built in 1995 at a cost of $3.2 million, it hosts various livestock-related and other events.

In 2015, it was announced as the home of the Pineywoods Bucks of American Indoor Football for 2016, however, the team appears to have folded prior to ever fielding a team.

References

External links
Rusk County Expo Center at VisitHendersonTX.com

Sports venues in Texas
Indoor arenas in Texas
1995 establishments in Texas
Rusk County, Texas